Ricky Gervais: Humanity is a stand-up comedy tour written and performed by British comedian Ricky Gervais. It was released by the streaming service Netflix.

Contents
The show addresses several subjects including the decision to not have children, comedy and offense taking, Caitlyn Jenner, social media and animal rights.

Reception
Brian Logan of The Guardian gave the special a positive review calling it Gervais's best standup show so far and saying that "even the liberal-baiting is more nuanced". Lucy Mangan of The Guardian gave the special a mixed review, stating that it is a "much better, less fragmented, more controlled show" than Gervais' previous stand up show Science and that it is "such a pleasure to watch Gervais work". She went on however to criticise Gervais' Caitlyn Jenner routine, stating that it is "the content [of the show], as ever, that divides critical and personal opinion" and that "[Gervais] can anatomise other people’s hypocrisy but refuses to turn attention to his own". The Telegraph gave the show a positive review, saying that it provided "a timely reconfirmation of [Gervais'] rare aptitude as a breeze-shooter: a winning combination of straight-talking pub philosopher, wind-up merchant and incorrigible class-clown". UK comedy website Chortle said that the show is "[Gervais'] most mature yet, not by sacrificing crassness, but by giving it context" and that "where this would once have been unadulterated boorishness coming from Gervais’s mouth, there’s a little more playfulness now – and a smudge of Stewart Lee-style sarcastic repetition"

References

External links

2018 films
2018 comedy films
British comedy films
Stand-up comedy concert films
Netflix specials
Ricky Gervais
2010s English-language films
2010s British films